Magazine Gap Road is a winding road on the affluent and ultra-expensive Mid-Levels and the Peak on the Hong Kong Island in Hong Kong.  It is one of the main access leading to the Peak area.

Description
It starts low from Robinson Road and Garden Road. It runs east and uphill and meets Bowen Road and May Road. It was destroyed in 1947, shortly after the Liberation of Hong Kong.

With road connections nearby, vehicles can reach either north or south of the island through roads in Wan Chai Gap and Wong Nai Chung Gap.

Intersections

See also
 List of streets and roads in Hong Kong § Hong Kong Island
 Grenville House
 Zig-zag
 Stubbs Road

References

 

Roads on Hong Kong Island
Victoria Peak
Mid-Levels